The 2012 Florida State Seminoles baseball team represented Florida State University in the 2012 NCAA Division I baseball season. The Seminoles played their home games at Mike Martin Field at Dick Howser Stadium, named for 33rd year head coach Mike Martin.

Florida State spent large parts of the season as the nation's top-ranked team, won their sixth consecutive Atlantic Division title and advanced to their fifth consecutive Super Regional. The Seminoles went on to appear in the College World Series for the fifteenth time, where they reached the semifinals.

Roster

Rankings

References

Florida State Seminoles baseball seasons
Florida State Seminoles
College World Series seasons
Florida State